Sofiya Aleksandrovna Velikaya (born 8 June 1985) is a Russian sabre fencer. 

Velikaya is a former European champion (four-time individual, six-time team), world champion (two-time individual, six-time team), and two-time Olympic team champion. She competed in the 2008, 2012, 2016, and 2020 Olympics, and is a three-time individual silver medalist.

She dedicated her team's 2016 Olympic gold medal to those Russians who had been banned for doping.

Career

Velikaya is a Russian Armed Forces captain. Her fencing clubs are the Russian Central Sports Army Club and MGFSO. Velilaya means "the Great" in Russian.

She placed fourth in the 2008 Beijing Games, after losing to American Sada Jacobson 11-15 in the semifinals, and then losing to American Rebecca Ward 14-15 in the bronze medal match. On 12 October 2011, she became the world champion after beating two-time Olympic champion American Mariel Zagunis in the final. One year after, she took part in the Summer Olympics in London, where she advanced to finals after defeating Olga Kharlan of Ukraine. She lost however to South Korea's Kim Ji-yeon, 9-15, and received silver.

Velikaya then took a break in her career. She gave birth to a son, with Olympic wrestler Aleksey Mishin. She came back to international competition in March 2014 at the Antalya World Cup, where she was defeated in the second round by Hungary's Anna Várhelyi. At the European Championships in Strasbourg, she was stopped in the second round again, this time by Italy's Rossella Gregorio. In the team event, Russia met France in the final, and won the gold medal. At the World Championships in Kazan Velikaya made her way to the quarter-finals, where she met reigning World champion Olga Kharlan of Ukraine. Velikaya was defeated 9–15. In the team event, Russia met France in the quarter-finals. Russia suffered a shock 41–45 defeat.

In the 2014–15 season, Velikaya won the first event in Cancún after defeating France's Charlotte Lembach in the final. She placed second with Russia in the team event. In Orléans, she  put an end to the invincibility of the world no.1 Olga Kharlan, who had not taken part in the Cancún tournament. Velikaya proceeded to the final where she defeated Italy's Rossella Gregorio and earned her second gold medal in a row. In the team event, Russia saw off the United States in the final to win team gold. Velikaya reached again the final in the New York Grand Prix. She met Kharlan, who defeated her 15–12, dooming her the silver medal. The same scenario played out in Athens at the first World Cup event of 2015, Velikaya losing by a single hit that time. In the team event, Russia fenced Ukraine in the final. Russia lost ground in the penultimate relay, which ended on 33–40. Velikaya lost 2–5 the final relay against Kharlan and came away with a second silver medal. At the Ghent World Cup, she defeated Kharlan 15–3 in the semi-finals, then Zagunis 15–10 in the final, to take her third gold medal of the season. 

Velikaya qualified for the 2016 Summer Olympics in Rio de Janeiro. In women's sabre in the table of 32 she defeated Bogna Jóźwiak from Poland. In the table of 16, quarter-finals and semi-finals, she prevailed over Charlotte Lembach, Cécilia Berder and Manon Brunet of France, respectively. She eventually lost 14–15 to her teammate Yana Egorian in the finals, winning her second consecutive silver medal at the Olympics in the individual women's sabre. Velikaya finally managed to claim Olympic gold a few days later in the team event. Russia defeated Mexico (45–31) in the quarter-finals, prevailed over the USA (45–42) in the semi-finals and met the Ukrainians in the final. Velikaya and her teammates came away with the gold medal, defeating Ukraine 45–30.

Velikaya dedicated her squad's 2016 Olympic gold medal to those Russians who had been banned for doping.

On 17 November 2016, Velikaya was elected the head of the Russian Olympic Committee Athletes' Commission.

In April 2022, she said she would boycott the Olympics if she is not allowed to compete under the Russian flag and anthem.

Medal record

Olympic Games

World Championship

European Championship

Grand Prix

World Cup

Honours and awards
 Russian Order of Merit for the Fatherland 1st class (13 August 2012) – for outstanding contribution to the development of physical culture and sports, high achievements at the 30th Olympic Games in London, United Kingdom.
 Russian Athlete of the Year (2015)
 Russian Order of Honour (25 August 2016) – for high achievements at the 31st Olympic Games in Rio de Janeiro, Brazil, the will to win and goal-oriented approach.
  Russian Medal of Military Valour (2016) – 1st class.

Personal life
At the age of 15, Velikaya moved from the city of Almaty in Kazakhstan to Moscow to train in fencing.</p>

Velikaya is married to 2004 Olympic champion wrestler Aleksey Mishin. They have two children together: a son named Oleg, born on 30 November 2013, and a daughter named Zoya, born in 2018.

References

External links

 
  (archive)
  (archive)
 
 

1985 births
Living people
21st-century Russian military personnel
Sportspeople from Almaty
Russian female sabre fencers
Fencers at the 2008 Summer Olympics
Fencers at the 2012 Summer Olympics
Fencers at the 2016 Summer Olympics
Olympic fencers of Russia
Olympic silver medalists for Russia
Olympic medalists in fencing
Medalists at the 2012 Summer Olympics
Medalists at the 2016 Summer Olympics
Olympic gold medalists for Russia
Universiade medalists in fencing
Universiade gold medalists for Russia
Fencers at the 2020 Summer Olympics
Medalists at the 2020 Summer Olympics
Olympic gold medalists for the Russian Olympic Committee athletes
Olympic silver medalists for the Russian Olympic Committee athletes